Dawn Brooke (born 1938) is the oldest natural mother in the British Isles, in Guernsey, one of the Channel Islands, but not in the United Kingdom. She gave birth in 1997 at the age of 59.
See more at: Pregnancy over age 50.

References

1938 births
Living people
Guernsey women
Maternity in the United Kingdom